Jim Fetherston (born June 1, 1945) is a former American football linebacker. He played for the San Diego Chargers from 1968 to 1969.

References

1945 births
Living people
American football linebackers
California Golden Bears football players
San Diego Chargers players